Camptopus lateralis, common name broad-headed bug, is a species of true bugs of the family Alydidae, subfamily Alydinae.

Distribution
This species is present in most of Europe.

Description
Body is elongated and rather hairy, with a dark brown background color, white margins and many veins in the membranous apex. Abdomen is orange brown. Head is wider than the pronotum. Antennae have four segments. Femurs are thorny and enlarged, while tibias are yellowish-brown and curved.

This species is rather similar to Alydus calcaratus, that has rectilinear tibias.

Biology
These bugs are polyphagous but they mainly feed on Coronilla, Lotus, Trifolium, Ononis, Astragalus, Medicago, Ulex and Genista (Fabaceae), Rosmarinus officinalis (Lamiaceae), Euphorbia characias (Euphorbiaceae), Quercus coccifera (Fagaceae),  Juniperus oxycedrus   (Cupressaceae) .

Gallery

Bibliography
Carapezza & Mifsud. 2015. Bulletin of the Entomological Society of Malta 7:41 
Cuesta Segura, Baena Ruíz & Mifsud. 2010. Bulletin of the Entomological Society of Malta 3:29
Dolling. 2006.. Catalogue of Heteroptera of the Palaearctic Region 5:35 
Germar. 1817. Reise nach Dalmatien und in das Gebiet von Ragusa 285-28
Moulet. 1995. Faune de France 81:9, 13, 17, 21, 252-259 
Wachmann, Melber & Deckert. 2007. Wanzen 3:204

References 

Alydinae